The Majorcan midwife toad (Alytes muletensis) (also Mallorcan midwife toad or ferreret in Balearic Catalan and Spanish) is a frog in the family Alytidae (formerly Discoglossidae). It is endemic to the Balearic Island of Majorca in the Mediterranean Sea. An example of Lazarus taxon, the species was first described from fossil remains in 1977, but living animals were discovered in 1979.

The species, considered "vulnerable" by the IUCN, is currently restricted to isolated mountain rivers in the island's Serra de Tramuntana and has an estimated population of 500 breeding pairs in the wild. It does exist and reproduce easily in captivity, however. The Majorcan midwife toad is thought to have disappeared from most of the island as a result of the introduction of competitors and predators from the mainland in ancient times. Reintroduction of the species in additional areas has taken place since 1988, with many new breeding populations now well established.

Characteristics 
Like all midwife toads, the male of the species always carries the developing eggs during the months of May and June. Generally the head and legs are large in comparison to the rest of the body. Unusually, the female of the species competes for the male, even grappling against other individuals in order to secure a mate. Both male and female frogs use a series of noises in order to attract a mate during courtship. Comparatively the female is larger than the male (Male: 34.7 mm, Female: 38 mm).

Distribution 
The species is endemic to Majorca, and is found only in the mountainous regions and gorges of the Serra de Tramuntana. In this area, the species inhabits streams in limestone caverns, where they hide under boulders and stones.

Status 
The Majorcan midwife toad was first discovered in 1977 and was described as Baleaphryne muletensis. Only later the toad was accounted as a midwife toad. This was due to the fact that the species was thought extinct and was described from the fossil record. Later the species was 'rediscovered' in 1979 when froglets and young frogs were discovered. Currently the species is protected as a Majorcan endemic species, and breeding programs have been started to prevent the extinction of this species. The number of wild animals is estimated at around 300 to 700 breeding pairs. It was previously housed and bred at the Durrell Wildlife Park, with the goal of releasing into the wild, which was successful.

References

External links
Amphibia Web http://amphibiaweb.org/cgi-bin/amphib_query?query_src=aw_maps_geo-euro&where-genus=Alytes&where-species=muletensis&rel-genus=equals&rel-species=equals (Accessed August 21, 2012)
Encyclopedia of Life http://eol.org/pages/1039071/details (Accessed August 21, 2012)
Arkive https://web.archive.org/web/20120825083227/http://www.arkive.org/mallorcan-midwife-toad/alytes-muletensis/ (Accessed August 21, 2012)

Alytes
Endemic fauna of the Balearic Islands
Fauna of Mallorca
Amphibians of Europe
Amphibians described in 1977